Yuri Olefirenko is a mid-size Project 773 (NATO code: Polnocny-C) landing ship of the Ukrainian Navy. From her original commissioning in 1971 until the 2014 Annexation of Crimea by the Russian Federation, she was based in the Southern Naval Base at Donuzlav. Since then Yuri Olefirenko was relocated to Ochakiv. She was reportedly captured by Russian forces during the 2022 Russian invasion of Ukraine before being spotted still in active service on 3 June 2022.

Construction and career

Soviet service
The ship was built at Stocznia Północna (pl) shipyard in Gdańsk, Poland in 1970 for the Soviet Navy and was numbered SDK-137. SDK is a Russian abbreviation for a mid-size landing ship (Sredniy Desantnyi Korabl, SDK).

Although officially the Soviet Union was not involved in the 1973 Yom Kippur War, SDK 137 was part of the Soviet Mediterranean squadron that was in the area along with a marine infantry detachment loaded. The vessel's enlisted starshina 1st stage P. Grinev downed one of the Israeli F-4 Phantom planes with the ship's AK-230 artillery system and was awarded for that the Order of Red Star.

Ukrainian service
As a result of the Soviet Black Sea Fleet division between Russian Black Sea Fleet and the Ukrainian Navy, in 1994 SDK 137 was passed to the Ukrainian Navy and was renamed SKD Kirovohrad. In 1996 it was commissioned and given the pennant number U-401 Kirovohrad.

In 1998–2002 Kirovohrad was repaired at the Metallist Ship Repair Factory in Balaklava and once again in 2012–2013 at the Black Sea Shipyard in Mykolaiv.

At the start of the 2014 Russian military intervention in Ukraine, on 21 March 2014 Kirovohrad was surrendered to unmarked Russian naval personnel at Lake Donuzlav along with the minesweeper Chernihiv.

In 2016 it was renamed again to U-401 Yuri Olefirenko in a memory of Ukrainian marine who perished during the War in Donbass.

In April 2022 the ship was claimed by Russian media to have again been captured by Russia at the port of Berdyansk and that she may have been moved to Novorossiysk. However, on 3 June 2022 Yuri Olefirenko was spotted in Ukrainian control near Ochakiv, Ukraine under fire by Russian artillery. The ship is believed to have survived the strikes and that it had not been captured at Berdyansk as previously claimed by Russian media.

Gallery

See also
 List of active Ukrainian Navy ships

References

External links

 SDK Yuri Olefirenko, project 773, formerly Kirovohrad. Korabli.eu.
 SDK Kirovohrad, project 773. Flot2017. 1 May 2011.
 Ship's propulsion system: 40DM. Propulsionplant.ru.

Ships of the Ukrainian Navy
Yuri Olefirenko
Ships built in Gdańsk
Annexation of Crimea by the Russian Federation
Yom Kippur War
Amphibious warfare vessels of the Soviet Navy
Naval ships built in Poland for export
1970 ships
Ships involved in the Russo-Ukrainian War